Lewis Whitmore Burnand (5 May 1839 – 31 January 1923) was an English first-class cricketer and stockbroker.

The son of George Burnand, he was born in May 1839 in Bloomsbury. He was educated at Harrow School before going up to Corpus Christi College, Cambridge. He played first-class cricket for the Marylebone Cricket Club in 1863 and 1864, making two appearances against Cambridge University at Fenner's, though with little success. After graduating from Cambridge, Burnard worked as a stockbroker in the City of London and was a partner in the firm Burnand & Co.. He died at Worthing in January 1923.

References

External links

1839 births
1923 deaths
People from Bloomsbury
People educated at Harrow School
Alumni of Corpus Christi College, Cambridge
English stockbrokers
English cricketers
Marylebone Cricket Club cricketers